A twistlock or twist lock, together with matching corner castings, as defined in norms including ISO 1161:1984, form a standardized (rotating) connector system, for connecting and securing intermodal, and predominantly ISO-standard international shipping containers.  The primary uses are to securely stack containers, for locking them into place on a container ship, semi-trailer or rail carriage, and for lifting and handling by specific container-handling equipment, like straddle carriers, reach stackers, container-handling forklifts, sidelifters, and various types of container cranes.

Twist-locks also have to be used when stacking shorter than 40-foot containers, together with 40foot (12.2 m) and longer containers. Shorter than 40foot containers must be joined together horizontally with twist-locks, to form a rigid combined whole of 40foot length, to make them stackable and be able to support and be supported by an ISO standard 40- or 45foot container stacked underneath or above them.

Description
The twistlock was developed in Spokane, Washington in the 1950s by transport engineer Keith Tantlinger. The relative obscurity of this invention belies its importance to a more efficient world trade and transport, as the Tantlinger lock made handling and stacking standard containers much easier. Tantlinger later released his patent royalty-free, which enabled the twist-lock to become an industry and international standard.

A major advantage of this approach to attachment is that containers, which may be stored or transported without being inspected for months at a time, do not require any maintenance in order to function effectively. Even with long term exposure to the weather the container remains as simple to move as ever. Only when corrosion is very extensive (to the extent of being easily visible) does the twistlock become dangerous to move the crate. The male part (which is more exposed and susceptible to damage) is placed on vehicles and equipment that are inspected very frequently, and will work with all standard containers.

Mechanism

The female part of the connector is the   corner casting, which forms each of the eight corners, welded to the container itself, and has no moving parts, only an oval hole in the tops of the four upper corners, and in the bottom of the four lower corners. The male component is the twistlock, which is fitted to cranes and transport bases. The mechanism is similar to that of a Kensington lock, but of a much larger size. The maximum size and position of the holes in the connector defined in the original patent and is now defined in international standard ISO 1161:2016. The tensile strength of a twistlock is rated at either 20 or 25 tonnes.

Some twistlocks have built-in levers or mechanisms, while simpler versions require tools for installation or removal. Some twistlocks are permanently installed (e.g. on the decks of container ships or on the beds of semi-trailers), while others are temporarily installed and removed as needed, for instance to stack containers securely on ships, or in storage yards.

Applications

Special types of twistlocks are also used in double-stack rail transport to secure the lower stack container with the upper one.

Notes

References

Bibliography

Intermodal containers
Port infrastructure
Locks (security device)